Daniel Gavins (born 20 March 1991) is an English professional golfer who currently plays on the European Tour. He won his first European Tour event at the 2021 ISPS Handa World Invitational.

Professional career
Gavins turned professional in 2012. He started his career playing on the PGA EuroPro Tour, winning once in 2013. He also finished 7th on the Order of Merit in 2015. He also played on the Challenge Tour.

In August 2021, Gavins won the ISPS Handa World Invitational by shooting a final-round 65 to beat David Horsey by one shot. He started the final round seven shots behind the leader.

In February 2023, Gavins won the Ras Al Khaimah Championship to claim his second European Tour victory. On the final hole, his ball found the water twice, but managed to salvage a double-bogey by holing a 25-foot putt. He won by one shot ahead of Alexander Björk and Zander Lombard.

Professional wins (3)

European Tour wins (2)

PGA EuroPro Tour wins (1)

See also
2015 European Tour Qualifying School graduates
2018 European Tour Qualifying School graduates

References

External links

English male golfers
European Tour golfers
Sportspeople from Leeds
1991 births
Living people